may refer to:

 Akatsuki (spacecraft), an uncrewed Venus orbiter
 , any of three classes of destroyers of the Imperial Japanese Navy
 , any of three destroyers of the Imperial Japanese Navy
 Akatsuki (train), operated between Kyoto and Nagasaki in Japan
 Japanese patrol vessel Akatsuki, launched in 2020

Fiction
 Akatsuki (TV series), a Japanese television drama series
 Akatsuki (Naruto), a fictional criminal organization in the manga and anime Naruto
 Akatsuki, a fictional character in the online game Kantai Collection, as well as its derived animated series of the same name
 ORB-01 Akatsuki, a fictional weapon in Mobile Suit Gundam SEED Destiny
 Akatsuki, a fictional mecha in the anime series Code Geass
 Akatsuki, a fictional character from the anime Log Horizon
 Akatsuki Kain, a character in the Vampire Knight anime and manga series
 Akatsuki, a fictional city in the Tegami Bachi manga series
 Akatsuki, a character in the video game Akatsuki Blitzkampf
 Akatsuki Ousawa, a character in the Aesthetica of a Rogue Hero book series
 Akatsuki Augus-Mixta, a character in the anime series Mobile Suit Gundam: Iron-Blooded Orphans
 Akatsuki is the name of former Demon Palace Emperor Alkaid's three man team in the video game .hack//G.U. Volume I //Rebirth ".hack//G.U."
Kirika Akatsuki, a character from Symphogear

See also

Ōmagatoki, a Japanese word for "dusk"